Krating Daeng ('red bull' or 'red gaur') is a non-carbonated energy drink created by Chaleo Yoovidhya. The drink is marketed and sold primarily in Southeast and East Asia; its derivative, Red Bull, is available worldwide in 165 countries.

Chaleo took the name from the gaur, a large wild bovine of Southeast Asia. The logo of the drink underlies its branding, with two red gaurs charging at each other backdropped by a sun.

History

Krating Daeng was first devised in 1975. It contains water, cane sugar, caffeine, taurine, inositol and B-vitamins. It was introduced in Thailand in 1976 as a refreshment for rural Thai labourers. "At first it was not very popular...", says current CEO Saravoot Yoovidhya. "It was quite different from others in the market, and Chaleo focused first on upcountry markets rather than in the cities where other competitors concentrated."

The working class image was boosted by sponsorship of Thai boxing matches, where the logo of two red bulls charging each other was often on display.

Krating Daeng has lost its leadership position in its home market of Thailand to M-150 and is now third in the country's energy drinks market, down to possibly only 7 percent market share in 2014.

Relation to Red Bull

The Thai product is from a different company than the global brand Red Bull as formulated by Dietrich Mateschitz, an Austrian entrepreneur. Mateschitz was the international marketing director for Blendax, a German toothpaste company, when he visited Thailand in 1982 and discovered that Krating Daeng helped to cure his jet lag. He worked in partnership with Chaleo's T.C. Pharmaceuticals to adapt the formula and composition to Western tastes. Red Bull was launched in 1987. The two companies are often mistaken for each other, but they are separate entities focusing on different target markets running in conjunction with one another. Today, Red Bull GmbH is 51 percent controlled by the Yoovidhya family, who own the trademark for the drink in Europe and the United States of America.

Sponsorship
  Persita Tangerang
  PSIM Yogyakarta

Health effects

By volume, Krating Daeng contains 33% less caffeine than Red Bull; Krating Daeng contains 32 mg caffeine per 150 ml bottle, while Red Bull contains 80 mg per 250 ml bottle.

Krating Daeng also contains taurine, glucose, and B vitamins.

See also 
 Kratingdaeng Racing Team

References

External links

 

Products introduced in 1976
1976 establishments in Thailand
Energy drinks
Red Bull
Thai drink brands